is a Japanese monthly shōnen manga magazine published by Shueisha. The magazine was started on December 3, 2010 with three completely original titles and seven spin-off manga from series in Weekly Shōnen Jump and V Jump. Originally a quarterly magazine, Saikyō Jump became a monthly publication in December 2011, before switching to publishing once every 2 months with the November 2014 issue. It switched back to a monthly schedule with the September 2021 issue.

Circulation
The magazine's mascot was created by Eiichiro Oda. Shueisha estimated that the vast majority of Saikyō Jump readers are elementary school aged children; 58.5% being upper elementary school aged, and 28% being lower elementary school aged.

Features

Current series

YouTube series

Former series

References

External links 
  

2010 establishments in Japan
Bi-monthly manga magazines published in Japan
Magazines established in 2010
Shōnen manga magazines
Shueisha magazines
Monthly manga magazines published in Japan
Quarterly manga magazines published in Japan